The Battle of Alberta is a term applied to the intense rivalry between the Canadian cities of Calgary, the province's most populous city (since 1976), and Edmonton, the capital of the province of Alberta (since 1905). Most often it is used to describe sporting events between the two cities, although this is not exclusive as the rivalry predates organized sports in Alberta.

Origins

Harvey Locke identifies a longstanding cultural divide in Alberta between the centre and north on one hand and the south on the other as a recurring theme in the province's history going back to pre-contact Aboriginal cultures. The peoples of the boreal forest, and to a lesser extent, the aspen parkland, led a subarctic lifestyle which involved trapping fur-bearing animals and travelling by canoe, which made the region a natural fit for the fur trade. By contrast the plains cultures on the prairie to the south relied on the buffalo. The predominant political force on the prairie during the fur trade, the Blackfoot Confederacy, would not allow the Hudson's Bay Company to establish itself within Blackfoot territory, preferring to ride to Edmonton House (established 1795) to trade. Around this time some Cree and allied peoples (the Iron Confederacy) pushed south onto the plains, and became rivals of the Blackfoot. By the 1810s, explorer Peter Fidler identified the Battle River as a disputed frontier between the two groups. Locke asserts that the lack of an HBC presence in the south set the stage for very different patterns of settlement in the different regions. Calgary was founded as a North-West Mounted Police fort and was not much of a settlement at all until the mid-1880s when the Canadian Pacific Railway (CPR) suddenly shifted its planned route across Western Canada from a northern one (via Edmonton) to a more southerly path (via Calgary). Therefore, the economic and cultural origins of Calgary and its region, were created up by the NWMP and the CPR, not the HBC. Because of the CPR line, Calgary's agricultural hinterland was settled much sooner, mostly by people of British, and particularly Scottish, origins but it also has an American influence because of the ranching culture brought into the region by American cowboys. By contrast, Edmonton's hinterland is marked by a French Canadian and Métis presence, and is predominantly occupied by people of non-British European origins. In particular, the region just to the east of Edmonton, Kalyna Country, is Canada's oldest and largest area of Ukrainian settlement.

Following the debate over the CPR, the next important contest between the two cities was to determine which would become Alberta's capital city when the province was created in 1905. By this time, two new transcontinental railways had been built, both via Edmonton, under the guidance of a federal Liberal government that had replaced the Conservative government which had overseen construction of the CPR. Equally important, the Liberals overhauled Canada's immigration system – whereas the Conservatives had endeavoured to restrict Western settlement to British immigrants, the Liberals had encouraged immigration from other parts of Europe, such as the Austro-Hungarian Empire. The result was that Edmonton and Northern Alberta became much more ethnically diverse than Calgary and Southern Alberta, and this at a time when prejudice against non-British ethnic groups (in particular, Slavic peoples) was commonplace among those of British extraction, adding another layer to the ill will between north and south.

Thus, by the turn of the century the differing political leanings of Calgary and Edmonton that persist to this day (that is, with Calgary being quite conservative by Canadian standards and Edmonton tending to be more progressive) were already well established. Not surprisingly then, when the federal Liberal government admitted Alberta to Confederation in 1905, they named Edmonton the capital. However, the Calgary elite were even more infuriated when Edmonton's neighbour, the then-separate city of Strathcona won the right to host the University of Alberta (see below).

The final important rivalry between the cities during Alberta's early years was over economic leadership, especially in the Oilpatch. Calgary's nearby Turner Valley deposits were discovered in 1914, decades before Edmonton's Leduc #1 field in 1947. This in part accounts for the much larger concentration of head offices of large corporations in Calgary. Edmonton's business community contains more private corporations working in oil and gas, consulting and smaller operations. Edmonton is also the research and manufacturing centre of the Canadian petroleum industry, and roughly 80% of Canada's oil production is sent to market through Refinery Row, located just east of the city in Strathcona County.

Today, although the rivalry is generally shown only during sporting events, there remains an 'unspoken' friendly rivalry between residents that remains on a subtle level.

Political leanings

The origins of and effects of the political leanings of the two cities are intertwined with and as old as the rivalry itself. When the CPR shifted its route southward, Canada was governed by the Conservatives who had generously supported the railway – this helped entrench a loyalty to the Tories in Calgary that persisted even during the early days of Confederation when most of Western Canada was solidly Liberal. However, when the Liberals gained power they championed not one but two more transcontinental railways, both of which passed through Edmonton. The result was boom times and massive immigration in and around Edmonton, which quickly displaced Calgary as Alberta's largest city and became solidly Liberal. It is widely believed that as a direct result of these leanings, the Liberal government in Ottawa designated Edmonton the provincial capital in 1905.

The different political leanings at first influenced and then, in turn, became influenced by the ethnic makeup of Edmonton and Northern Alberta, compared to Calgary and Southern Alberta. Whereas the Conservatives had taken steps to limit immigration from the United States and block immigration from virtually anywhere else besides the British Isles, the Liberals encouraged immigration from much of Europe. Although the largest single ethnic group in Edmonton and the north remained British, and although immigration by non-Caucasians remained actively discouraged and heavily restricted, many Canadians of British origin decried what they perceived as the "mongrelization" of the Dominion. Not surprisingly, this opposition became centred around the much more exclusively British city of Calgary, which increasingly looked down on the "mongrelized" north. In that context, especially considering the level of superiority those of British extraction viewed their own culture, the decision to place the university in Strathcona was particularly insulting to the British elite based in Calgary.

Relations between Calgary and the provincial government in Edmonton hit an all-time low following the 1913 general election, in which the provincial Liberals under Arthur Sifton won a large majority – the size of which they owed in no small part to a blatant gerrymandering of the electoral districts which in particular left Calgary badly under-represented in the legislature. Such was the level of hostility by this time that a serious movement commenced to petition the federal government, by then back in Conservative hands, to admit Calgary and southern Alberta to Confederation as a separate province. At the time, the British North America Act would theoretically have allowed the creation of one province from the territory of another even without the consent of the government of the province concerned. With a sympathetic government in Ottawa the movement to create a separate province might have had some chance of success, had it not been for the outbreak of World War I which naturally diverted the attention of both the government and the public. During the war, the Sifton government chose to align itself closely with the federal government under Robert Borden, eventually supporting conscription over the explicit objections of federal Liberal leader Wilfrid Laurier. These decisions helped to ease tensions between Calgary's Conservative elite and the provincial Liberal government in Edmonton. In a low-key election, Sifton led his government to another majority, then left provincial politics to become Minister of Customs in the new "Unionist" government in Ottawa. The new government was essentially a coalition of pro-conscription Liberals and Conservatives under Borden's leadership.

The political rivalry between Calgary and Edmonton cooled even further after the 1921 general election, in which Conservative support collapsed throughout the province including Calgary, and in which the Liberals were swept from power by the rural-based United Farmers of Alberta. For the next fifty years, provincial politics was split more or less on an urban-rural basis, with rural voters consistently and overwhelmingly supporting UFA and then Social Credit governments while the Conservatives and Liberals made intermittent efforts at electoral co-operation in an attempt to maintain a foothold at least in the two major cities.

Nevertheless, the political leanings of the two cities have persisted over the years to the present. While Calgary has elected mayors in the past who have been known to be Liberals, Calgary was long reckoned as the most conservative major city in Canada. Since 1912, only seven Liberals have ever won election to the House of Commons from Calgary-based ridings. Although the Labour Party of Canada and Social Credit made inroads in the 1920s and 1930s, it was the Progressive Conservatives who dominated federal elections in Calgary, with few exceptions, until the Reform Party swept the federal Tories out of Alberta in 1993. Reform and its successor, the Canadian Alliance continued to dominate in Calgary (and Alberta) until merging with the PCs to form the Conservative Party of Canada. The former Prime Minister, Stephen Harper, represented Calgary Southwest, the riding that had once been held by founding Reform leader Preston Manning.

The Conservatives continued to dominate federal politics in Calgary until the 2015 federal election, which saw the Liberals not only win the second-most seats in their history, but also turn in their strongest showing in Western Canada in a quarter-century. They took two ridings in Calgary—one fewer than they had won in that city in their entire history. Both ridings reverted to the Tories at the 2019 election, but the Liberals managed to seize one of them back in 2021. No Liberal has ever held a Calgary riding for more than one term.

Meanwhile, the stronger government, university, greater ethnic heterogeneity and labour class presence in Edmonton has helped to keep the city on the political left by Albertan standards. In federal politics, Edmonton remained friendly to the Liberals in early decades, although in recent decades Edmonton's federal ridings have tended to follow the trend set by the rest of Alberta, usually electing Social Credit, PC, Reform, Alliance and finally Conservative MPs—though usually by much reduced pluralities than those found in Calgary. However, the federal New Democratic Party of Canada (NDP) won Edmonton East in 1988 for one term. The Liberals then achieved their first real success in Edmonton in decades in 1993 when four Liberals were elected compared to three Reformers. Two of these Liberals, Anne McLellan (who was Deputy Prime Minister in the early 2000s) and David Kilgour (a former PC) managed to win re-election in Edmonton three times each before being defeated and retiring, respectively in the face of the Tory sweep of Alberta in 2006. In 2008 New Democrat Linda Duncan won Edmonton—Strathcona, the only opposition seat in the province. In the 2011 election, Duncan held her seat, and the Tories held all of theirs, both in Edmonton and in the rest of Alberta. At the 2015 election, the Liberals took two seats in Edmonton, Duncan held onto her seat, and the Tories won the remainder. In 2019, the Tories swept all of Edmonton except for Duncan's seat in Edmonton Strathcona, the only non-Tory seat in Alberta. The Liberals managed to seize back one Edmonton seat in 2021, with the NDP taking an additional seat.

In provincial politics, the political differences are more noticeable. The Social Credit Party of Alberta dominated most of Alberta's ridings, including Edmonton and Calgary, for most of the time it governed from 1935 until 1971. When the Progressive Conservatives under Calgarian Peter Lougheed won election in 1971, they went on to dominate both cities' ridings themselves for the next decade. Lougheed retired in 1985 and was succeeded by Edmontonian and former Eskimos quarterback Don Getty. A year later, in 1986, the Alberta New Democrats and Alberta Liberal Party made their first breakthrough in Edmonton in recent memory. For the next three decades, the Tories continued to win a majority of seats in every election both province-wide and in Calgary, but gained a majority of Edmonton's seats only once (in 2001) while the party had a Calgarian as leader.

In 1989, the Tories were cut down to only two seats in Edmonton. Getty himself was defeated in his own Edmonton riding and forced to run in a by-election to get back into the legislature. Getty retired in 1992 and was succeeded by Ralph Klein, a former mayor of Calgary who defeated a former mayor of Edmonton, Liberal Laurence Decore in the 1993 election. The previous Liberal Leaders of the Opposition tended to represent Edmonton ridings. During the 2006 PC leadership convention, Calgary-based candidates Ted Morton and Jim Dinning both fared poorly in Edmonton, which contributed to the victory of Ed Stelmach. Stelmach's victory continued a pattern under which since Lougheed assumed the premiership in 1971 in which successive Tory leaders (and premiers) alternated between Calgary and Edmonton-area ridings; Stelmach represented Fort Saskatchewan-Vegreville, on Edmonton's eastern fringe.

Stelmach was able to make gains in Edmonton at the expense of both the Liberals and NDP during the 2008 election, while the Liberals made gains in Calgary. From 2008 to 2012 the Official Opposition had an even number of members from both cities, with the leader Raj Sherman representing Edmonton-Meadowlark. On the other hand, Stelmach, like Getty before him, had a relatively short tenure as premier – he resigned in 2011, and was replaced by Calgarian Alison Redford. Redford led the PCs to an unexpected 12th term in government in 2012, but was forced out of politics two years later. She was ultimately succeeded by Calgarian and former federal cabinet minister Jim Prentice, breaking four decades of alternation between Calgary- and Edmonton-based leaders.

During the 2012 general election, the trends in both cities were broadly similar, but with noticeable distinctions. Both cities voted over 40% for the centrist or centre-right PCs led by Redford. The second placed right-wing Wildrose Party, led by Danielle Smith, was much stronger in Calgary (36.41%) than in Edmonton (18.8%). Smith is a Calgary native, and was elected from Highwood on Calgary's southern fringe. The centrist or centre-left Liberals were slightly stronger in Edmonton (16.13%) than in Calgary (12.16%), and the centre-left New Democrats were much stronger in Edmonton (21.56%) than in Calgary (4.9%), as were the upstart Alberta Party (2.46% in Edmonton, compared to less than one percent in Calgary). It is notable to mention that the media speculated that the overall province-wide Liberal vote collapsed as a result of Liberal voters voting PC in tactical voting, presumably to stop a Wildrose victory.

Moreover, the 2012 election further demonstrated an extension of the north–south political divide into rural Alberta. Wildrose won every rural seat south of the 53rd parallel but one, as well as both seats in Medicine Hat. However, the Progressive Conservatives took all but one rural seat north of the 53rd parallel, as well as both seats in Red Deer and both seats in Lethbridge.

The Tory dominance was finally broken in the 2015 general election, when the Alberta New Democratic Party won power under Edmontonian Rachel Notley. Notably, the NDP won power on the strength of winning the most seats in both Edmonton and Calgary, upsetting the traditional political divide. The NDP scored a clean sweep of Edmonton, taking every seat in the city by 4,000 votes or more. In Calgary, massive vote-splitting between the PCs and Wildrose allowed the NDP to take 15 seats, the first time in 80 years that a centre-left party had won the most seats in Calgary. After only one term, however, the NDP was turned out of office in 2019 by the United Conservative Party, a merger of the Tories and Wildrose under the leadership of Calgarian and former federal cabinet minister Jason Kenney. This election saw Alberta's traditional political divide reassert itself. The UCP took all but three seats in Calgary, while the NDP held on to all but one seat in Edmonton. Kenney retired in 2022 and was succeeded by Smith, who sought to enter the legislature from a Medicine Hat riding, making her the first premier i over half a century not to represent a Calgary- or Edmonton-area riding while in office.

Hosting of events
The rivalry also extends outside of team sports to international events. Both cities have hosted numerous national and international championships and other tournaments, often in a spirit of one-upmanship: there is constant need for local politicians to prove that their city is "world class" or at least better than the other.

The constant one-upmanship of the two cities in this field has receded in recent years, and they cooperated in a successful joint bid to host the 2012 World Junior Ice Hockey Championships (WJIHC).

Events hosted in Calgary
Calgary hosted the 1988 Winter Olympics, the 1996 International Rotarian Convention, and the 1997 World Police and Fire Games as well as the World Skills competition in 2009. Calgary is also an annual stop for many winter sport organizations, including International Skating Union (speed skating), International Bobsleigh and Skeleton Federation, International Luge Federation, and some International Ski Federation events. Calgary is also home to the world-famous Calgary Stampede.

Calgary was designated as "Canada's Cultural Capital" in 2012 for the inaugural year of the program. The federal government granted $1.6 million to develop and renovate the city's cultural institutions and promote the arts.

Social entrepreneurs and scholars convened in Calgary during October 2013 for the 6th Social Enterprise World Forum to discuss solutions for global problems.

In the summer of 2015, Calgary hosted the 2015 World Handball Championships. The ten-day tournament hosted athletes from 30 nations.

Calgary was named the host the 2024 Special Olympics Canada Winter Games.

Events hosted in Edmonton
Edmonton hosted the 1978 Commonwealth Games, the 1983 World University Games (Universiade), the 2001 World Championships in Athletics, and the 2005 World Masters Games. The city also had a circuit on the IndyCar Series, the Edmonton Indy, from 2005 to 2012. Edmonton was designated as one of the host cities of the 2015 FIFA Women's World Cup.

As of 2022, the Archdiocese of Edmonton hosted two papal visits: Peace tours of John Paul II in 1984, and the reconciliation visit of Pope Francis in 2022.

Edmonton annually hosts North America's largest fringe festival, the Edmonton International Fringe Festival, every August; the same month also sees the Edmonton Folk Music Festival. Edmonton also hosted the Canadian Finals Rodeo during the second week of November from 1974 to 2017. The Edmonton International Street Performers Festival takes place every June. The city also plays host to K-Days every July.

Direct competition: Expo 2017 
In 2007, Edmonton started assessing the viability of hosting Expo 2017. The Edmonton City Council approved the building of a bid on April 15, 2009. Later in April, Calgary announced its coming bid to host Expo 2017, though it had not expressed any interest beforehand. In July of the same year, a disagreement occurred when Edmonton received provincial funding for its bid, while Calgary did not. Calgary withdrew its bid to host the event.

Sports

Baseball

Cannons vs. Trappers
Alberta's most prominent baseball rivalry existed between the Calgary Cannons and Edmonton Trappers of the Pacific Coast League. The Cannons existed from 1985 to 2002 while the Trappers existed from 1980 to 2004. The rivalry never reached the same level as it did in other sports, however, and ultimately both teams relocated to the United States (the Trappers to Round Rock, Texas, and the Cannons to Albuquerque, New Mexico). The Trappers captured four PCL championships during their existence, while the Cannons won none.

Vipers vs. Capitals
In 2011, the two cities competed in the North American League as the Calgary Vipers and Edmonton Capitals. The two teams met in the Northern Division playoffs in 2011; the Capitals won the series in six games. The Vipers folded after the season, and the Capitals suspended operations in February 2012, leaving the province with no professional baseball.

Football
The rivalry between the cities' professional Canadian football teams is equally intense, and even predates the hockey rivalries, as the first football games in Alberta history took place in the 1890s. A team from Edmonton made history as they played in the first football game in Alberta, playing to a scoreless tie against Clover Bar. The first game played between teams from Edmonton and Calgary took place in 1891 when Edmonton beat Calgary 6–5 in a total point challenge series.

The rivalry had been diminished for a number of years until the Calgary City Rugby Football Club and the Edmonton Rugby Football Club were formed in 1906 and 1907 respectively where the two teams competed in the Alberta Rugby Football Union. In 1908, the teams were re-organized as the Calgary Tigers and Edmonton Esquimaux where the Esquimaux won the ARFU title that year. From then on, the two cities had multiple teams represent them in the Alberta Union, but instability led to a lack of consistent rivalry battle between the two. Teams named the Calgary Canucks, Calgary 50th Battalion, Calgary-Altomah Tigers, Edmonton Elks, Edmonton Eskimos, and Edmonton Boosters all took turns playing in the ARFU. It was not until the creation of the Western Interprovincial Football Union that a truly sustained rivalry could take place between two teams representing the two cities.

Today, the primary football team rivalry consists of the Edmonton Elks (formerly the Eskimos prior to 2020), and the Calgary Stampeders.

Elks vs. Stampeders

In 1921, a team from Edmonton called the Edmonton Eskimos won the Alberta Rugby Football Union (ARFU) league title. They made it past the winners of the Manitoba Rugby Football Union (MRFU) and Saskatchewan Rugby Football Union (SRFU), becoming the first Alberta team (and the first Western Canadian team) to ever compete for the Grey Cup, losing in the 9th Grey Cup game, then advancing again the next year (as the Edmonton Elks) to a loss in the 10th Grey Cup. The team's name goes back to the dawn of the Battle of Alberta when, at the end of the 19th century, a "rugby football" game between Edmonton and Calgary saw the Calgary media make reference to Edmonton's more northern latitude by calling the city's residents "Esquimeaux" (an archaic spelling of "Eskimos"). This Eskimos team folded in 1924, but the Edmonton Eskimos football name reappeared in the ARFU with a different team in 1929, moving to the Western Interprovincial Football Union (WIFU) in 1938 before folding again in 1940.

A similar Calgary Rugby Football Club formed in 1907, competing in the AFRU under various names until – while operating as the Calgary Bronks – joining the Regina Roughriders (from the SRFU) and Winnipeg Blue Bombers (from the MRFU) to form the higher-level WIFU in 1936. The Bronks folded after the 1941 season, the year after the Eskimos had folded. A subsequent Calgary team, the Calgary Stampeders, was formed and joined the WIFU in 1948. This Stampeders team advanced to that year's 36th Grey Cup, becoming the first Calgary team to compete for the Grey Cup and the first Alberta team to win that championship.

The next season, in 1949, the current incarnation of the Edmonton Eskimos – now known as Edmonton Elks, was founded and immediately joined the WIFU – this time, for good. This Eskimos team's first ever game was on Labour Day against the defending Grey Cup Stampeders, who defeated the Eskimos 20–6 in the restart of the currently ongoing version of the football Battle of Alberta. Since 1949, the Elks and Stampeders have played on Labour Day every year with the exception of eleven seasons, having an unbroken run since the 1982 season. This has been one of the Canadian Football League's marquee match-ups, with the Monday Labour Day Classic in Calgary followed by the Friday night (Saturday, since 2014) rematch in Edmonton, resulting in a very short turnaround for both teams. As of the 2021 CFL season, the all-time record favours Edmonton, as the Elks have a record of 128–104–3 against their provincial rivals.

In terms of the post-season, the two teams have played each other 27 times, with Edmonton holding a slight edge with 14 victories. The two teams also frequently meet in the West Final. Between 1990 and 2003, the two teams clashed nine times to decide who would represent the West in the Grey Cup, and at least one Alberta team was in the game each year. Calgary has won six out of the last nine playoff match-ups, the most recent one in the 2017 West Final. Calgary has also won the most recent championship by an Albertan team, in 2018 with the 106th Grey Cup game. While the Stampeders may have won the Grey Cup first and the most recent, the Elks have won the most, with 14 titles compared to the Stampeders' eight as of 2021.

Currently, the Calgary and Edmonton franchises play each other two to three times during the regular season and have played each other at least three times in every regular season but 2004 and 2018 between 1996 and 2019. The Stampeders have qualified for the playoffs in every season since 2005, while the Elks have missed the playoffs five times in that same time frame. Both teams have enjoyed much success in their histories as both franchises have never missed the playoffs at the same time. The Elks have made the playoffs in all but seven years since 1966, including 34 years in a row from 1972 to 2005 – a streak unmatched in North American major league sports. The Stampeders have only missed the playoffs six times since 1978.

Hockey
During the first week of March, 1895 a team of Calgarians mostly from the Calgary Fire Brigade's hockey club, travelled to Edmonton to play against a Mounted Police team from Fort Saskatchewan and the Edmonton Thistles shutting out both. It was the first recorded game between any Calgary and Edmonton teams.

The first professional hockey rivalry between the two cities dates to the founding of the Western Canada Hockey League in 1921. Both cities received teams, Calgary the Tigers, and Edmonton the Eskimos. The Eskimos won the WCHL title in 1923, but lost the Stanley Cup to the rival National Hockey League's Ottawa Senators. Calgary also appeared in a Stanley Cup championship series in 1924, but lost to the Montreal Canadiens of the NHL. After the demise of the WCHL in 1927, Alberta hockey fans turned to junior hockey. Both cities had teams in the Western Hockey League and Alberta Junior Hockey League.

Pro hockey did not return until the World Hockey Association arrived in 1972. Both cities received teams, but Calgary's Broncos folded without playing a game. The new Edmonton Oilers, then were left without an intra-provincial rival until a new WHA team, the Calgary Cowboys arrived in 1975, but they folded in 1977. The short and sporadic nature of the Calgary WHA franchises made building meaningful rivalries more difficult. The WHA itself was unstable and merged with the NHL in 1979.

Flames vs. Oilers

Since 1980, one of the most intense and passionate expressions of this rivalry is the frequent match-ups between the National Hockey League (NHL) clubs based in each city – the Calgary Flames and the Edmonton Oilers.

The Oilers were established as a World Hockey Association (WHA) team in 1972 and joined the NHL as a part of the NHL–WHA merger in 1979. They were soon followed by the Atlanta Flames moving to Calgary in 1980, making the question of who would reign as the top team in Alberta a hot topic. The Flames were the higher-ranked squad in their inaugural season, finishing with 39 wins and 92 points and making it to the Stanley Cup semifinals. The following year the Oilers became the dominant franchise when the Oilers shot to the top of the Smythe Division and Wayne Gretzky started his career-long process of shattering over 100 NHL records and milestones.

The rivalry was especially bitter in the second half of the 1980s. For much of this time, the Flames and Oilers were the two best teams in the Campbell Conference, and by some accounts in the entire league. During this time, the Alberta teams won six of the eight Stanley Cup Championships, including the Oilers winning five Cups, a feat that has not been repeated since. The Edmonton Oilers of 1983–90 are recognized as one of the NHL's last great dynasties, with line-ups through this period that featured Hockey Hall of Fame (HHOF) legends like Gretzky, Glenn Anderson, Paul Coffey, Grant Fuhr, Kevin Lowe, Jari Kurri and Mark Messier, guided by HHOF coach Glen Sather. The 1984–85 Oilers would be voted as the greatest NHL team of all-time during the league's 2017 centennial celebrations. This period of repeated confrontations was mainly due to the way the playoffs were structured for much of this time. The top four teams in each division made the playoffs, and the winners of the divisional rounds met in the conference finals. As the Flames and Oilers were both in the Smythe Division, this made it very likely they would face each other in the first or second round, en route to the conference finals. That same system made it a near-certainty that all other playoff qualifiers in the Campbell Conference faced the nearly unachievable (during that 8-year period) task of having to get past either the Oilers or Flames (or both) to make the Stanley Cup Finals.

The Oilers defeated the Flames in the playoffs in 1983, 1984, 1988, and 1991, on their way to two of their five Stanley Cups. The Flames defeated the Oilers in the 1986 NHL playoffs; game 7 was decided when rookie Oiler defenceman Steve Smith accidentally scored on his own goal, which pushed the rivalry to a new level. The Flames were favoured in the 1988 playoffs, having won the Presidents' Trophy, but the Oilers swept the series and eventually went on to win the Cup.

After their opening round matchup in 1991, the two teams did not meet again in the playoffs until 2022. The Oilers, the 1990 Stanley Cup champions, had finished 20 points behind the Flames, the 1989 Stanley Cup champions. Despite this, the Oilers were able to push the series to seven games, with Esa Tikkanen leading the underdog Oilers to an overtime victory on his third goal of the game.

Due to the sheer talent and skill exhibited by both teams in the mid to late-1980s, Alberta was considered a "Death Valley" for teams coming to play on a road trip. The honing of skills developed by the Oilers and Flames by playing the "other" best team in the NHL this many times a year made a swing through Alberta quite daunting for the rest of the teams in the league. The two Alberta teams showed their collective domination over the other 19 teams in the NHL by finishing a joint first and second in the Smythe Division six times between the 1982–83 and 1989–90 regular seasons (neither team lower than third in the nine seasons from 1981 to 1982 through 1990–91), finishing a joint first and second in the larger Clarence Campbell Conference four times between the 1985–86 and 1989–90 regular seasons (neither team lower than fifth from 1981 to 1982 through 1990–91) and finishing with both teams in the top 10 of the entire NHL seven times between the 1983–84 and 1989–90 regular seasons (with both teams in the top 5 of the entire NHL in four of those seasons). At least one of the two Alberta teams finished first or second overall for the entire NHL in every one of those nine seasons.

With the changes to the regular season schedule from the 1991–92 NHL season onwards, the two teams no longer played each other eight times a year. Falling to only four times a year by 2016–17, except for the 2020–21 NHL season where they played 10 times due to play exclusively against Canadian NHL teams due to the COVID-19 pandemic, causing the rivalry to cool off. Changes in the playoff format also reduced the opportunities for the two teams to meet in the intensity of a condensed seven games in less than two weeks — as they went 31 years between playoff meetings after the 1991 series. As the NHL expanded in the United States, Canada declined from seven of 21 league teams in 1990–91 to six of 30 by the 2000–01 NHL season. The two Alberta franchises faced financial hardships, since they were among the smallest markets in the league, restricting their ability to pay for higher quality talent and further reducing the competitiveness of the Battle of Alberta games and their ability to reach the playoffs. The situation was not addressed until June 2005, when the NHL became the last major North American professional sports league to introduce a salary cap, coupled with improved revenue sharing.

It took well over a decade for either team to return to anything near the form they had exhibited in the 1980s. The Flames advanced to the 2004 Stanley Cup Finals, falling in seven games to the Tampa Bay Lightning. The Flames became the first team in the modern era of the NHL to defeat all three division winners en route to the Stanley Cup final. The next Stanley Cup final, (played in  due to the NHL lock-out of 2004–05) saw the Edmonton Oilers fall in seven games to the Carolina Hurricanes. The Oilers became the first 8th seed in NHL history to advance past the semifinals, let alone make it to the Stanley Cup final. The Oilers faced a playoff drought for 10 seasons after their run in 2006–07, not qualifying for the playoffs until the 2016–17 season. The Flames made the playoffs every year until 2009, but then had their own playoff drought of six consecutive seasons.

There have been three regular season sweeps in the history of the rivalry. The Flames swept the six-game series in 2009–10 and the five-game series in 2014–15, while the Oilers swept the four-game series in 2016–17. The Flames’ sweep of the Oilers in 2009–10 was significant in the sense that they tied the rivalry's win–loss–tie overall regular season and playoff series (since the team's move to Calgary) on December 28, 2009. They then took the overall series lead with their victory over the Oilers three days later, and they have not relinquished it since (as of the end of the 2019–20 season). The Oilers had previously led the series since October 20, 1981. The aforementioned 2009–10 season also marked the first-ever trade between the two rivals, with Edmonton's Steve Staios being traded for Calgary's Aaron Johnson on March 3, 2010.

The rivalry saw a large revival in early 2020. During a game on January 11, 2020, Calgary's Matthew Tkachuk and Edmonton's Zack Kassian began a feud. Beginning with two hits that Kassian felt were "predatory" in nature from Tkachuk, including a hit that knocked off Kassian's helmet. In response, Kassian attempted to begin a fight, grabbing and punching Tkachuk. Tkachuk did not fight back and assumed a defensive position, leading Kassian to be given a double minor penalty for roughing and a misconduct. On the ensuing power play, Calgary scored the game-winning goal. After the game, Tkachuk's decision to "turtle" stirred controversy among players, fans, and sports writers. The teams met again on January 29, which saw Tkachuk and Kassian fight near the end of the first period, with Kassian saying “Thanks kid, I appreciate you doing this." In the next game on February 1, the first Goalie fight between the two teams erupted, in the midst of a full line brawl. It was considered by many fans as the epitome of the battle of Alberta, with Oilers radio announcer Jack Michaels saying,  "This is the battle of Alberta we've been waiting for, for three decades!" during his coverage of the game.

During the 2022 Playoffs, the Edmonton Oilers and Calgary Flames faced off in the second round. Both the Flames and Oilers narrowly won their previous rounds, both which went to Game Seven. Game One set the tone for the rest of the series, with a record setting high scoring game, which ended in a Flames 9–6 victory. The Oilers then won the next four games, with players such as the Oilers' Evander Kane scoring multiple goals, and a hat-trick. In Game 5, both teams scored in total 4 goals in 71 seconds, bringing the score to 4–4 at the end of the second period. In the third period, a controversial goal by Flames player Blake Coleman was called off for being knocked in with a kicking motion, resulting in the game remaining tied. The game went to overtime where Oilers' star player, Connor McDavid, scored from a quick snapshot 5 minutes in. The Oilers advanced to the Western Conference Finals for the first time since 2006, but they were swept by the Colorado Avalanche.

Hitmen vs. Oil Kings

Although not nearly as intense, the Western Hockey League intends to develop one for the Calgary Hitmen and Edmonton Oil Kings. The junior clubs are owned by the Flames and Oilers respectively. Both cities have had several franchises throughout the WHL's history. The original Oil Kings franchise faced the Calgary Centennials from the league's founding in 1966 until the Oil Kings relocation to Portland in 1976. The Calgary Hitmen were formed in 1995, followed a year later by the Edmonton Ice. The Ice never gained a foothold in Edmonton, and left for the Kootenays after two years. The Hitmen survived their initial struggles to grow into one of junior hockey's biggest drawing teams. The modern Oil Kings joined the WHL as an expansion franchise in 2007.

There are currently five Alberta-based WHL teams. In addition to Calgary and Edmonton, there are also the Medicine Hat Tigers, Lethbridge Hurricanes, and Red Deer Rebels and they all play together in one division, making for many intense intra-provincial battles.

Lacrosse

Roughnecks-Rush rivalry

Box Lacrosse has seen significant growth in Alberta in recent years, with the Calgary Roughnecks joining the National Lacrosse League in 2001, followed by the Edmonton Rush in 2005. The two teams were poised to form another Alberta rivalry as the two cities have in many other sports. The Rush took out ads in Calgary newspapers before their first ever meeting saying the Rush would "open a can" on the Roughnecks. This backfired as the Roughnecks defeated the Rush. The Roughnecks tried this tactic against Edmonton before the April 5, 2008 game by placing an ad in the Edmonton Sun saying that Edmonton was a "City of Losers" instead of a "City of Champions". Just as it had for the Rush, the plan backfired as the Rush won 11–9. Calgary won the Champion's Cup in 2004 and 2009. Edmonton won the Champion's Cup in May 2015, before moving to Saskatoon that July.

Soccer

A rivalry existed between Cavalry FC and FC Edmonton of the Canadian Premier League. It had been nicknamed the Al Classico. As per the fashion in rivalries in Association football around the world, the Wildrose Cup was created and was awarded annually to the team that wins the most points from the Al Classico in league play.

University sports

Another prominent rivalry exists between the major universities in each city, notably the University of Alberta, in Edmonton, and the University of Calgary, dating back to the creation of the province of Alberta in 1905.

Heated wrangling took place between the cities of Calgary and Edmonton over the location of the new provincial capital and of the new provincial university. The neighbouring province of Saskatchewan had been formed on the same day as Alberta, settling a similar dispute between its own two major cities by making Regina the provincial capital and Saskatoon the site of the University of Saskatchewan. Alberta's first Premier, Alexander Rutherford, offered a similar solution by stating that the Alberta capital would be north of the North Saskatchewan River and that the provincial university would be in a city south of the river. The city of Edmonton, on the north bank of the river, became the capital while the city of Strathcona, on the south bank of the river (and the location of Rutherford's home), was granted the university. When the two cities were amalgamated in 1912, Edmonton became both the political and academic capital.

Calgary was not granted a university until 1966.

Sports competitions between the two universities have taken place over who has possession of a painted rock. Meanwhile, the University of Alberta has consistently ranked much higher than the University of Calgary in major national and international rankings of universities.

See also

 Battle of Ontario

Notes

References

Further reading

External links

The Battle of Alberta Blog

Calgary Flames
Calgary Stampeders
Culture of Alberta
Edmonton Elks
History of the Edmonton Oilers
National Hockey League rivalries
Cavalry FC
FC Edmonton
Soccer in Alberta
Regional rivalries
Sport in Calgary
Sport in Edmonton
Sports rivalries in Canada
Sport in Alberta
Soccer rivalries in Canada
Lacrosse in Canada
Mass media in Alberta
Politics of Alberta
History of Canadian football
1880s establishments in Alberta
Regionalism (politics)
Nicknamed sporting events